The New Society of Letters at Lund (Vetenskapssocieteten i Lund in Swedish) is a scientific academy founded in 1920. The purpose of the foundation was "to promote scientific humanities research", to which younger scientists in the humanities, theology and social sciences at Lund University would gather. The founders were the Sanskrit researcher , the folklore scholar Carl Wilhelm von Sydow, and the linguist , with the assistance of the historian Lauritz Weibull. The name was taken from the Royal Society of Sciences in Uppsala

The members are divided into different categories: honorary members (maximum seven), domestic working members (maximum 100), foreign working members (maximum 35) and founding members (maximum 50). At the age of 55, the working member transfers to the seniors group.

A person who has shown a special commitment to the humanities and culture, or a person whom the Society finds capable of contributing to the Society's activities and development, may be appointed as a founding member. The founding member has the same rights as the domestic working member.  The various categories have been slightly expanded since the institute.

Honorary members 

 Göran Bexell
 Hilma Borelius
 Nils-Arvid Bringéus
 Gunnar Broberg
 Kjell Åke Modéer
 Birgitta Odén
 Eva Österberg

See also

References

External links 
 Official website

Scientific societies based in Sweden
Scientific organizations established in 1920
Organizations based in Lund